Pepper's ghost is an illusionary technique.

Pepper's Ghost may also refer to:

Pepper's Ghost (band), American rock band from Philadelphia
Pepper's Ghost (Buckethead album), 2007
Pepper's Ghost (Arena album), 2005

See also
 Ghost pepper